Senator Bartley may refer to:

Mordecai Bartley (1783–1870), Ohio State Senate
Thomas W. Bartley (1812–1885), Ohio State Senate